Daniel McCraney (July 1, 1834 – February 28, 1885) was an Ontario lawyer and political figure. He represented Kent East in the Legislative Assembly of Ontario from 1875 to 1885 as a Liberal member.

He was born in Trafalgar Township, Upper Canada in 1834, the son of Hiram McCraney. McCraney studied in Oakville, went on to study law and was called to the bar in 1871. In 1866, he had married Janet Ewan. He set up practice in Bothwell. McCraney served as mayor of Bothwell from 1868 to 1873. He was first elected to the Ontario assembly in 1875 after Archibald McKellar retired from politics. He died in office in 1885.

McCraney Township in Nipissing District was named after him.

His son George Ewan was a member of the Canadian House of Commons from Saskatoon and his brother William was also an MP and mayor of Oakville.

External links 
The Canadian parliamentary companion, 1883 JA Gemmill
Member's parliamentary history for the Legislative Assembly of Ontario
The Canadian biographical dictionary and portrait gallery of eminent and self-made men ... (1880) - entry for William McCraney

1834 births
1885 deaths
Ontario Liberal Party MPPs
Mayors of places in Ontario
People from Chatham-Kent